"Alliances" is the 30th episode of American science fiction television series Star Trek: Voyager airing on the UPN network, the 14th episode in the second season.

The series follows the adventures of the Federation starship Voyager during its journey home to Earth, having been stranded tens of thousands of light-years away. In this episode, Captain Janeway tries to form alliances to help them on their way back.

The episode aired on UPN on January 22, 1996.

Plot
A Kazon attack takes the life of another Voyager crewman, this time the popular ex-Maquis soldier Kurt Bendera. Chakotay, a good friend of Bendera, delivers the eulogy and tells of a time Bendera rescued him from angry miners. After the funeral, Michael Jonas and Crewman Hogan tell Captain Janeway Voyager should change the way she operates to be more like a Maquis.

Chakotay voices the proposal of forming an alliance with one or two Kazon factions to secure peace, not to trade technology, but to offer protection from attacking forces and emergency supplies. In a following talk with Tuvok, he gives the example of peace formed by the unlikely alliance between the Federation and Klingons and how it helped stabilize the quadrant. Janeway opens up to the idea of an alliance and the officers decide to talk with Seska and her maje (leader), Cullah, about allying with her tribe. Meanwhile, Neelix decides to use some of his contacts to propose an alliance with a different tribe.

Initial attempts begin badly, as Cullah detests following orders from a woman. Janeway's rejection of Cullah's offer to trade crew also angers him. Meanwhile, Neelix is abducted before he is able to contact the maje. He is imprisoned with a number of aliens, including many women and children. These are the Trabe, who had been imprisoned because of a generations-long conflict between them and the Kazon. Neelix befriends the Trabe elder, who gets his assurance of help in any escape attempts. Other Trabe forces attack the Kazon stronghold and Neelix, keeping an eye out for the children, assists. They escape on pilfered Kazon merchant-vessels, which had, it was revealed, originally been constructed by the Trabe, along with all the other technology used by the Kazon.

Janeway learns about the past between the Trabe and the Kazon, and decides to pursue paths of an alliance with the Trabe in spite of the danger of the possibility of it rallying the Kazon together against them. They try to pre-empt their wrath by attempting to form peaceful negotiations. Seska finds it a great opportunity to learn the weaknesses of the other tribes and potentially use it to gain an edge against all other Kazon as well as Voyager and the Trabe. The Voyager crew learns someone is planning to disrupt the conference, but they cannot determine who. They decide that any Kazon who attempts to leave the conference would be the guilty party.

The Kazon also hear something is amiss, but all the maje attend, too frightened to be left out of an alliance. The Kazon are suspicious especially of the Trabe, but Cullah is vocal about his distaste for befriending either the hated Trabe or a woman-led Federation. Unfortunately, the Trabe elder is the one to try to leave the conference. Janeway yells out that it is a trap. She, her party and the Trabe elder beam out as a ship fires into the conference-room. Voyager attacks the ship, driving it away. The Kazon manage to survive.

Janeway breaks the alliance with the Trabe and flees before the Kazon are able to retaliate. More vulnerable than ever and in space filled with lawless races, she emphasizes the need to hold on to what rules they have.

Reception 
In 2020, The Digital Fix said this was the worst episode in season two of Star Trek: Voyager, and felt that it was "a mess from beginning to end." They were not happy with the character of Janeway or the presentation of the Kazon.

References

External links
 

Star Trek: Voyager (season 2) episodes
1996 American television episodes
Television episodes directed by Les Landau